Banca Popolare di Puglia e Basilicata S.C.p.A. is an Italian cooperative bank based in Altamura, in the Province of Bari, Apulia.

The bank had 137 branches covered 12 out of 20 regions of Italy. However, they were located mainly in Southern Italy: 75 in Apulia (covered all 6 provinces), 14 in Campania, 10 in Basilicata, 4 in Abruzzo and 3 in Molise (0 in Calabria and the two islands); in central Italy 9 in Lazio, 4 in Marche and 2 in Emilia-Romagna (Ravenna and Rimini; 0 in Tuscany and Umbria regions); in northern Italy, 1 in Friuli – Venezia Giulia (in Pordenone), 4 in Veneto, 9 in Lombardy and 2 in Piedmont (in Biella and Vercelli).

History
Banca Popolare di Puglia e Basilicata was formed by several mergers of cooperative banks from the southern Italy.

Banca Popolare della Murgia
Banca Popolare della Murgia was formed in 1972 by the merger of Banca Cooperativa Agraria di Gravina (found 1883) and Banca Mutua Popolare Cooperativa di Altamura (found 1888). In 1994 the bank absorbed Cassa Rurale e Artigiana dell'Icona di Tursi, a bank from nearby Basilicata region.

Banca Popolare di Puglia e Basilicata
In 1995 Banca Popolare della Murgia absorbed Banca Popolare di Taranto (found 1889) to form Banca Popolare di Puglia e Basilicata. In the same year the bank also acquired Banca Popolare della Provincia di Foggia. From 1996 to 2001 the bank also absorbed Banca di Credito Cooperativo dell'Alto Bradano di Banzi, Banca di Credito Cooperativo Vulture Vitalba di Atella and some business units of Banca di Credito Cooperativo degli Ulivi – Terra di Bari and Banca di Credito Cooperativo di Corleto Perticara. In 2002 the bank acquired 10 branches of Capitalia from Apulia, Campania and Molise regions.

See also
 Banca Popolare di Bari, an Italian bank based in Bari, Apulia
 Banca Popolare Pugliese, an Italian bank based in Parabita, in the Province of Lecce, Apulia
 Banca Apulia, an Italian bank based in San Severo, in the Province of Foggia, Apulia, a subsidiary of Veneto Banca
 Banco di Napoli, an Italian bank serving south Italy, a subsidiary of Intesa Sanpaolo
 Banca Carime, an Italian bank serving south Italy, a subsidiary of UBI Banca
 Banca di Credito Cooperativo dell'Alta Murgia, an Italian bank

 Banca di Roma, a defunct subsidiary of UniCredit
 Banca Mediterranea, a defunct bank in southern Italy, a successor of Banca Popolare di Pescopagano e Brindisi 
 Banca della Campania, a defunct subsidiary of Banca Popolare dell'Emilia Romagna
 Banca Popolare del Mezzogiorno, a defunct subsidiary of Banca Popolare dell'Emilia Romagna
 Banca Cattolica di Molfetta, an Italian bank based in Molfetta, Apulia, a defunct subsidiary of Banca Antonveneta

References

External links
  

Cooperative banks of Italy
Banks established in 1972
Italian companies established in 1972
Companies based in Apulia
Altamura